Thyraeum or Thyraion was a city in ancient Arcadia, Greece, in the district Cynuria. According to Greek mythology, Thyraeum was founded by Thyraeus, a son of Lycaon. It was already ruined in the 2nd century, when it was visited by Pausanias. It was near Hypsus (present Stemnitsa), Zoetia and Paroria. 

Its site is tentatively located near modern Palamari.

References

Populated places in ancient Arcadia
Former populated places in Greece
Arcadian city-states
Trikolones